This is a list of electoral district results for the 1965 New South Wales state election.

Results by electoral district

Albury

Armidale

Ashfield−Croydon

Auburn

Balmain

Bankstown

Barwon

Bass Hill

Bathurst

Blacktown

Bligh

Bondi

Bulli

Burrinjuck

Burwood 

 Ben Doig was the sitting Liberal member for Burwood, however he lost pre-selection which he blamed on his support for state aid to church schools.

Byron

Canterbury

Casino

Castlereagh

Cessnock

Clarence

Cobar

Collaroy

Concord

Coogee

Cook's River

Cronulla

Drummoyne

Dubbo

Dulwich Hill

Earlwood

East Hills

Eastwood

Fairfield

Georges River

Gloucester

Gordon

Gosford

Goulburn

Granville

Hamilton

Hartley

Hawkesbury

Hornsby

Hurstville

Illawarra

Kahibah

King

Kirribilli

Kogarah

Kurri Kurri

Lake Macquarie

Lakemba

Lane Cove

Lismore

Liverpool

Maitland

Manly

Maroubra

Marrickville

Monaro 

The sitting member John Seiffert Sr died in January 1965.

Mosman

Mudgee

Murray

Murrumbidgee

Nepean

Newcastle

Orange

Oxley

Parramatta

Phillip

Raleigh

Randwick

Redfern

Rockdale

Ryde

South Coast

Sturt

Sutherland

Tamworth

Temora

Tenterfield

The Hills

Upper Hunter

Vaucluse

Wagga Wagga

Wakehurst

Waratah 

Edward Greaves died and Frank Purdue won the resulting by-election.

Wentworthville

Willoughby

Wollondilly

Wollongong−Kembla

Wyong

Young

See also 
 Candidates of the 1965 New South Wales state election
 Members of the New South Wales Legislative Assembly, 1965–1968

Notes

References 

1965